Lesley Francesca Vickerage (born Woolwich, 1961) is an English actress best known for her roles as WPC Jenny Dean in the television series Between the Lines, as Lieutenant (later Captain) Kate Butler in Soldier Soldier, as Helen Lynley in the television series The Inspector Lynley Mysteries, and as Aunt Jane in the television series Moonfleet.

She is an enthusiast of English folk music and is often seen at the annual Chippenham Folk Festival.

She had a walk on part in 1991 in King Ralph as a woman in the shop near the end of the film. She played Ellie in My Good Friend, Helen Lynley in The Inspector Lynley Mysteries, Viv Casey in Grafters, the space pilot Vornholt in the BBC series Bugs and she has also been in The Bill, Silent Witness, Sea of Souls, Inspector Morse, Holby City, Law & Order: UK, Midsomer Murders, Doctors, Lewis, My Family ‘’The Murder Room’’ and Between The Lines. Most recently, she played Liz in Friday Night Dinner and Katherine Dutta in the Inspector Lewis episode, "Down Amongst the Fearful".

She was scheduled to appear in the Salisbury Playhouse production of Ira Levin's play Deathtrap in February 2016.

References

External links 
 

Living people
English television actresses
Alumni of the Drama Studio London
People from Woolwich
20th-century English actresses
21st-century English actresses
Year of birth missing (living people)